Events in the year 1894 in Portugal.

Incumbents
Monarch: Charles I

Events
15 April – Portuguese legislative election, 1894

Arts and entertainment

Sports

Births

12 April – Francisco Craveiro Lopes, president (died 1964)
19 November – Américo Tomás, admiral and politician (died 1987).

Deaths

References

 
1890s in Portugal
Portugal
Years of the 19th century in Portugal
Portugal